The following is a sortable, but partial list of active and some decommissioned lighthouses along the Norwegian coastline.

The sequence number follows the convention of listing lighthouses from the coastal border in the south with Sweden around the coast and north to coastal border with Russia.

Lighthouses

See also 
 Lists of lighthouses and lightvessels
 Lighthouses in Norway

References

External links 

 

Norway

Lighthouses
Lighthouses